Sleman is a kapanewon (regency district) and the seat capital of Sleman Regency, Special Region of Yogyakarta, Indonesia. It is on the road between Yogyakarta and Magelang. Sleman has five villages, namely Caturharjo, Pandowoharjo, Tridadi, Triharjo, and Trimulyo.

It was also a stopping place on the railway that followed the same route, but is currently inactive.

Climate
Sleman has a tropical monsoon climate (Am) with moderate to little rainfall from June to September and heavy to very heavy rainfall from October to May.

References

Districts of the Special Region of Yogyakarta
Regency seats of the Special Region of Yogyakarta
Sleman Regency